Noel C. Gardner is an American psychiatrist who is a professor at the University of Utah and was a key witness in the state competency hearing for Brian David Mitchell.

Gardner holds a masters of divinity from Andrews University and an M.D. from Loma Linda University.

He is currently the medical director of Impact Mental Health in the Greater Salt Lake City Area, treating those with mental health problems who do not have health insurance.

Sources
 announcement of Gardner appearing at CSU Fresno
 background material about a presentation Gardner would give at Loma Linda
 Deseret News, March 12, 2005
 director of Impact Mental Health, formerly the Polizzi Clinic

Andrews University alumni
Loma Linda University alumni
University of Utah faculty
American psychiatrists
Living people
Year of birth missing (living people)